Joseph Charles Aub (1890-1973) was an American endocrinologist and professor then chair of medicine at Harvard University.  He graduated from Harvard College and Harvard Medical School.

The lead industry funded Aub's research which ignored the health effects of lead on children.

Honours and awards

Foreign honours
 : Officer of the Order of the White Lion (1946)

References

External links
 Joseph C. Aub papers, 1918-1974. H MS c169, Harvard Medical Library, Francis A. Countway Library of Medicine, Boston, Mass.

1890 births
1973 deaths
American endocrinologists
Harvard Medical School alumni
Members of the United States National Academy of Sciences
Officers of the Order of the White Lion